William Prim (October 30, 1882 – May 4, 1930), nicknamed "Shinny", was an American Negro league catcher between 1907 and 1909.

A native of Indianapolis, Indiana, Prim made his Negro leagues debut in 1907 with the Indianapolis ABCs. He went on to play for the Leland Giants and Cuban Giants through 1909. Prim died in Indianapolis in 1930 at age 47.

References

External links
 and Seamheads

1882 births
1930 deaths
Cuban Giants players
Indianapolis ABCs players
Leland Giants players
20th-century African-American people